Novosadovy is a rural locality (a settlement) and the administrative center of Novosadovsky Rural Settlement, Belgorodsky District, Belgorod Oblast, Russia. Population:   There are 128 streets.

Geography 
Novosadovy is located 27 km northeast of Maysky (the district's administrative centre) by road. Stary Gorod is the nearest rural locality.

References 

Rural localities in Belgorodsky District